State Route 146 (SR 146) is a state highway in the U.S. state of California in Monterey and San Benito Counties.  The route serves as an entryway to Pinnacles National Park, located in the Gabilan Mountains, from both U.S. Route 101 in the Salinas Valley on the west and State Route 25 near Paicines on the east. The route is broken into two sections and cannot be used to completely pass through Pinnacles National Park.

Route description
Route 146 is divided into two sections and does not provide a continuous vehicular route through the park.  The western part of Route 146 passes from U.S. Route 101 near Soledad along Metz Road and Shirttail Canyon Road to the west area of Pinnacles.  The eastern portion runs into the east area of Pinnacles from Route 25 along Pinnacles Road.

Highway 146 has the distinction of following the San Andreas Fault line for much of its length. As it does, it straddles two separate landmasses: the Pacific Plate and the North American Plate.

SR 146 is not part of the National Highway System, a network of highways that are considered essential to the country's economy, defense, and mobility by the Federal Highway Administration. SR 146 is eligible for the State Scenic Highway System, but it is not officially designated as a scenic highway by the California Department of Transportation.

History
According to the National Park Service, Pinnacles has been administered as a wilderness area as long as that unit has been under their jurisdiction, and NPS sources contacted during research cannot recall any time when Route 146 proceeded through the park unbroken.

Major intersections

See also

References

External links

Caltrans: Route 146 highway conditions
California Highways: Route 146
California @ AARoads.com - State Route 146

146
State Route 146
State Route 146
Gabilan Range
Pinnacles National Park
Salinas Valley